Ostend is a settlement on Waiheke Island, in New Zealand's Hauraki Gulf within the Auckland Region. Ostend is located in the west of the island, on and around a small peninsula which juts into Putiki Bay, one of two large indentations in the island's southwest coast. The southwest of the island contains much of the island's population, with Ostend being located immediately to the east of the settlement of Surfdale, and to the southwest of Onetangi.

Ostend is connected to Surfdale by a causeway which crosses the western arm of Putiki Bay. The area is used by boatsmen who moor their boats on the beach, as it is easy to access from the mainland marina at Half Moon Bay. Ostend is home to the island's only supermarket (Countdown), a branch office of the Auckland council, the island's Baptist church, and a medical centre. It is known as the industrial area of the island.

History

In late 1915, a competition was held to decide the name of the new settlement, which was won by Miss Boylan, a resident of Auckland, who suggested the name Ostend, referencing the Belgian city of the same name, which had been a part of the theatre of World War I. The land at Ostend Estate was first auctioned on 18 February 1916. The name area originally referred to land at both Putiki Bay and Onetangi Bay (modern-day Ostend and Onetangi).

Demographics

Ostend had a population of 1,905 at the 2018 New Zealand census, an increase of 171 people (9.9%) since the 2013 census, and an increase of 288 people (17.8%) since the 2006 census. There were 771 households, comprising 933 males and 972 females, giving a sex ratio of 0.96 males per female. The median age was 45.3 years (compared with 37.4 years nationally), with 285 people (15.0%) aged under 15 years, 315 (16.5%) aged 15 to 29, 891 (46.8%) aged 30 to 64, and 411 (21.6%) aged 65 or older.

Ethnicities were 87.7% European/Pākehā, 12.1% Māori, 3.6% Pacific peoples, 4.7% Asian, and 4.9% other ethnicities. People may identify with more than one ethnicity.

The percentage of people born overseas was 32.6, compared with 27.1% nationally.

Although some people chose not to answer the census's question about religious affiliation, 62.8% had no religion, 22.2% were Christian, 0.6% had Māori religious beliefs, 0.3% were Hindu, 0.2% were Muslim, 1.1% were Buddhist and 4.4% had other religions.

Of those at least 15 years old, 405 (25.0%) people had a bachelor's or higher degree, and 216 (13.3%) people had no formal qualifications. The median income was $28,500, compared with $31,800 nationally. 219 people (13.5%) earned over $70,000 compared to 17.2% nationally. The employment status of those at least 15 was that 750 (46.3%) people were employed full-time, 270 (16.7%) were part-time, and 39 (2.4%) were unemployed.

Education

One of the three schools on Waiheke Island is in Ostend. The others are in Surfdale.

References

Populated places on Waiheke Island